In chess, there are a number of ways that a game can end in a draw, neither player winning. Draws are codified by various rules of chess including stalemate (when the player to move is not in check but has no legal move), threefold repetition (when the same position occurs three times with the same player to move), and the fifty-move rule (when the last fifty successive moves made by both players contain no  or pawn move). Under the standard FIDE rules, a draw also occurs in a dead position (when no sequence of legal moves can lead to checkmate), most commonly when neither player has sufficient  to checkmate the opponent.

Unless specific tournament rules forbid it, players may agree to a draw at any time. Ethical considerations may make a draw uncustomary in situations where at least one player has a reasonable chance of winning. For example, a draw could be called after a move or two, but this would likely be thought unsporting.

In the 19th century, some tournaments, notably London 1883, required that drawn games be replayed; however, this was found to cause organizational problems due to the backlog. It is now standard practice to score a decisive game as one point to the winner, and a draw as a half point to each player.

Draw rules
The rules allow for several types of draws: stalemate, threefold or fivefold repetition of a position, if there has been no  or a pawn being moved in the last fifty or seventy five moves, if checkmate is impossible, or if the players agree to a draw. In games played under time control, a draw may result under additional conditions. A stalemate is an automatic draw, as is a draw due to impossibility of checkmate. The draw by fivefold repetition or the seventy-five-move rule is mandatory by the arbiter.

A claim of a draw first counts as an offer of a draw, and the opponent may accept the draw without the arbiter examining the claim. Once a claim or draw offer has been made, it cannot be withdrawn. If the claim is verified or the draw offer accepted, the game is over. Otherwise, the offer or claim is nullified and the game continues; the draw offer is no longer in effect.

The correct procedure for an offer of a draw is to first make a move, verbally offer the draw, then press the clock. The other player may decline the draw offer by making a move, in which case the draw offer is no longer in effect, or else indicate acceptance. The offer of a draw should be recorded by each player in their score sheet using the symbol (=) as per Appendix C.12 of FIDE Laws of Chess.

Scoring
In early tournaments, draws were often replayed until one of the players won; however, this was found to be impractical and caused organizational difficulties. The 1867 Paris tournament even ignored draws altogether, effectively treating them as double losses. The 1867 Dundee tournament initiated the awarding of a half point for draws, which is now standard practice. A minority of tournaments use a different scoring scheme, such as "football scoring" where 3 points are awarded to the winner and 1 point to each in the event of a draw. For the purpose of calculating Elo rating, these tournaments are treated as if they were using standard scoring.

Draws in all games
Article 5 of the 2018 FIDE Laws of Chess gives the basic ways a game may end in a draw; more complicated ways are detailed in Article 9:

 Stalemate – if the player on turn has no legal move but is not in check, this is stalemate and the game is automatically a draw.
 Threefold repetition rule – if an identical position has occurred at least three times during the course of the game with the same player to move each time, and is the current position on the board or will occur after the player on turn makes their move, the player on move may claim a draw (to the ). In such a case the draw is not automatic – a player must claim it if they want the draw. When the position occurs for the third time after the player's intended next move, they write the move on their  but does not make the move on the board and claims the draw. Article 9.2 states that a position is considered identical to another if the same player is on move, the same types of pieces of the same colors occupy the same squares, and the same moves are available to each player; in particular, each player has the same castling and en passant capturing rights. (A player may lose their right to castle; and an en passant capture is available only at the first opportunity.) If the claim is not made on the move in which the repetition occurs, the player forfeits the right to make the claim. Of course, the opportunity may present itself again.
 Fifty-move rule – if in the previous 50 moves by each side, no pawn has moved and no  has been made, a draw may be claimed by either player. Here again, the draw is not automatic and must be claimed if the player wants the draw. If the player whose turn it is to move has made only 49 such moves, they may write their next move on the scoresheet and claim a draw. As with the threefold repetition, the right to claim the draw is forfeited if it is not used on that move, but the opportunity may occur again.
 Fivefold repetition – If the same position occurs five times during the course of the game, the game is automatically a draw (i.e. a player does not have to claim it).
 Seventy-five-move rule – If no capture or no pawn move has occurred in the last 75 moves (by both players), the game is automatically a draw (i.e. a player does not have to claim it). If the last move was a checkmate, the checkmate stands.
 Impossibility of checkmate – if a position arises in which neither player could possibly give checkmate by a series of legal moves, the game is a draw. Such a position is called a dead position. This is usually because there is insufficient material left, but it is possible in other positions too, such as a blocked king and pawn ending where it is impossible for either king to capture the pawns. Combinations with insufficient material to checkmate include:
 king versus king
 king and bishop versus king
 king and knight versus king
 king and bishop versus king and bishop with the bishops on the same color.
 Mutual agreement – a player may offer a draw to their opponent at any stage of a game. If the opponent accepts, the game is a draw.

There is no longer a rule defining perpetual check—a situation in which one player gives a series of checks from which the other player cannot escape—as a draw. Any perpetual check situation will eventually be claimable as or end in a draw under the threefold repetition rule, the fifty-move rule, or (most likely) by agreement. By 1965, perpetual check was no longer in the rules.

Although these are the laws as laid down by FIDE and, as such, are used at almost all top-level tournaments, at lower levels different rules may operate, particularly with regard to rapid play finish provisions.

Examples

Draws in timed games
In games played with a time control, there are other ways a draw can occur.

 In a sudden death time control (players have a limited time to play all of their moves), if it is discovered that both players have exceeded their time allotment, the game is a draw. (The game continues if it is not a sudden-death time control.)
 If only one player has exceeded the time limit, but the other player does not have (theoretically) sufficient mating material, the game is still a draw. Law 6.9 of the FIDE Laws of Chess states that: "If a player does not complete the prescribed number of moves in the allotted time, the game is lost by the player. However, the game is drawn if the position is such that the opponent cannot checkmate the player's king by any possible series of legal moves, even with the most unskilled counterplay." For example, a player who runs out of time with a sole king versus king and bishop does not lose the game. It is still possible to lose on time in positions where mate is extremely unlikely but not theoretically impossible, as with king and bishop versus king and knight. (Under USCF rules, king and bishop, king and knight, or king and 2 knights with no pawns on the board is not considered sufficient mating material, unless the opponent has a forced win, even though it is theoretically possible to mate (but extremely unlikely to happen) in situations such as K+B vs. K+N).
 Because of this last possibility, article 10 of the FIDE laws of chess states that when a player has less than two minutes left on their clock during a rapid play finish (the end of a game when all remaining moves must be completed within a limited amount of time), they may claim a draw if their opponent is not attempting to win the game by "normal means" or cannot win the game by "normal means". "Normal means" can be taken to mean the delivery of checkmate or the winning of material. In other words, a draw is claimable if the opponent is merely attempting to win on time, or cannot possibly win except on time. It is up to the arbiter to decide whether such a claim will be granted or not.

Frequency of draws
In chess games played at the top level, a draw is the most common outcome of a game: of around 22,000 games published in The Week in Chess played between 1999 and 2002 by players with a FIDE Elo rating of 2500 or above, 55 percent were draws. According to chess analyst Jeff Sonas, although an upward draw rate trend can be observed in general master-level play since the beginning of the 20th century, it is currently "holding pretty steady around 50%, and is only increasing at a very slow rate". Draw rate of elite grandmasters, rated more than 2750 Elo, is, however, significantly higher, surpassing 70% in 2017 and 2018.

In top-level correspondence chess under ICCF, where computer assistance is allowed, the draw rate is much higher than in the over-the-board chess: of 1512 games played in the World Championship finals and the Candidates' sections between 2010 and 2013, 82.3% ended in a draw. Since that time, draw rate in top-level correspondence play has been rising steadily, reaching 97% in 2019.

Drawing combinations
Yuri Averbakh gives these combinations for the weaker side to draw:
 perpetual check
 stalemate
 blockade
 perpetual pursuit
 fortress
 drawing balance of forces

Terminology

 A book draw or theoretical draw is a position that is known to result in a draw if both sides .
 A positional draw is an impasse other than stalemate, where a draw is salvaged despite a big material disadvantage (see ).
 A grandmaster draw is a game in which the players quickly agree to a draw after making little or no effort to win (see ).

Andy Soltis discusses the vagueness of the terms "draw", "drawish", "drawable", "book draw", "easy draw", and "dead draw". In books and chess theory a position is considered to be a draw if best play leads to a draw – the difficulty of the defence is not taken into account. Soltis calls these positions "drawable". For instance, under that criterion the rook and bishop versus rook endgame is usually a theoretical draw or book draw, but the side with the bishop often wins in practice. In this position from an actual game, the only move to draw is 124.Rf8! White actually played 124.Rd8 and lost after 124...Re3, with the winning threat of 125...Bh3+ 126.Kg1 Re1#.

See also
 Rules of chess
 Tie (draw)

Articles on draw rules
 Draw by agreement
 Fifty-move rule and Seventy-five-move rule
 Stalemate
 Threefold repetition and Fivefold repetition

References

Bibliography

Further reading

External links
 FIDE Laws of Chess
 article by International Grandmaster Joel Benjamin
 ChessGames article on some interesting draws
 Chessbase article on draw debate
  “Chess Draws” by Edward Winter

Rules of chess
Chess terminology